Li Quan (Simplified Chinese:李全; ?-1231 AD) was a Chinese general who served in the Jin dynasty.

Footnotes
大金國志 (Daikin Records) - Volume 25
宋史 (History of Song) - Volume 475

Jin dynasty (1115–1234) generals
1231 deaths